Kadamba is a Sanskrit word meaning dove and may refer to:

Dynasties
Kadamba dynasty (345–525 CE)
Kadambas of Hangal (980–1031 CE); include the minor kingdoms of Bankapur, Bayalnad, Nagarkhanda and Uchchangi
Kadambas of Goa (10th to the 14th century CE)
Kadambas of Halasi (founded by Mayurasharma in about 4th century AD)

Films
Kadamba (1983 film)
Kadamba (2004 film)

People
 Kadamba Kanana Swami, an ISKCON guru
 Kadamba Simmons, a British actress and model

Other
Kadamba architecture
Kadamba script
Kadamba tree
Kadamba Transport Corporation, a state owned transport company (Goa)
INS Kadamba, a new base of the Indian Navy

See also
 Kadamban
 Kadambar
 Kadambari (disambiguation)
 Kadambas, Nepal